Rajasthan Pradesh Congress Committee (RPCC) is the Pradesh Congress Committee (state wing) of the Indian National Congress (INC) serving in the state of Rajasthan.

Rajesthan Legislative Assembly election

List of presidents

List of chief ministers of Rajasthan from Indian National Congress

Following is the list of the chief ministers of Rajasthan from Indian National Congress:

List of deputy chief ministers of Rajasthan from Indian National Congress

Following is the list of the deputy chief ministers of Rajasthan from Indian National Congress:

References

External links
 

Indian National Congress by state or union territory
Politics of Rajasthan